FC Aroma Gulkevichi was a Russian football team from Gulkevichi. It played professionally from 1992 to 2002. Their best result was 4th place in Zone 2 of the Russian Second Division in 1993.

Team name history
 1989-2006 FC Venets Gulkevichi
 2007-2008 FC Aroma Gulkevichi

External links
  Team history at KLISF

Association football clubs established in 1989
Association football clubs disestablished in 2009
Defunct football clubs in Russia
Sport in Krasnodar Krai
1989 establishments in Russia
2009 disestablishments in Russia